"Honey I Need" is a song written by Dick Taylor and first performed by the rock band Pretty Things in 1965. It was first published in 1966 and registered at number 13 in the UK Pretty Things guitarist Dick Taylor wrote the tune, along with a couple of friends who weren't in the band.

Personnel 

 Phil May – vocal
 Dick Taylor – lead guitar
 Brian Pendleton – guitar
 John Stax – bass guitar
 Viv Prince – drums

Influence 
The poppiest element of the song, and most likely the one that got it to climb the British hit parade, is the insistent, uplifting chorus, which is followed by a typically verging-on-undisciplined, raw bluesy guitar solo. May slightly changes the melody of the verse when he returns after the break, adding a little more urgency to a song that was already plenty propulsive. It was those kinds of little clever attentions to subtleties that belied the Pretty Things' image as crude musical louts, lifting them above most of the standard raw British R&B-derived rock groups of the mid-'60s in originality.

Chart performance

References

External links 

 

1965 singles
1965 songs
Pretty Things songs
Fontana Records singles
Rhythm and blues songs
British garage rock songs
Songs written by Dick Taylor